Jean-Jacques Boussemart (born 22 April 1963) is a French former sprinter, born in Lourdes, who competed in the 1984 Summer Olympics. He also won 2 French 200 metre titles in 1983 and 1984

International competitions

References

1963 births
Living people
People from Lourdes
French male sprinters
Olympic athletes of France
Athletes (track and field) at the 1984 Summer Olympics
Mediterranean Games gold medalists for France
Mediterranean Games silver medalists for France
Athletes (track and field) at the 1983 Mediterranean Games
Mediterranean Games medalists in athletics
Sportspeople from Hautes-Pyrénées